Sheo or Shiv is a village in Barmer district of Rajasthan state of India. It is a tehsil headquarters. It is also spelled as Shiv, although Sheo is the preferred way of writing the name. The village is located in the Thar desert.

Rajpurohit, Jat, Mali, Rajput and Muslim dominated This village has an important contribution in the politics of Rajasthan, province of India. Jaswant Singh Jasol, father of the politician of the Sheo region, Manvendra Singh, has made an important contribution to the politics of India.  The current Shiv MLA Mr. Amin Khan has been a former Minister of the Government of Rajasthan.  At times Mr. Amin Khan has also been in controversies.
It is famous for its variety of cuisines, culture and ethnicity.
One of the known personality here is the N Shree Group which lives nearby in a dhani[smaller than a village] named Poonjaraj Singh Ki dhani. The people here are very helpful in nature.The N shree group has many shops,hotels.
It consists of Rajpurohit community.One of the famous shop here for sweets,cafe and general store are N shree misthan bhandar and N shree Kirana store and one of its famous hotel is Rajkamal Hotel.

Demographics
Population of Sheo according to the census 2001 is 3,689.  Where Male population is 2,012, while female population is 1,677.
Population of Sheo according to the census 2010 is 5,000 approx.

References

 Geographical details

Villages in Barmer district
Tehsils of Barmer district